Ludowika Margaretha of Zweibrücken-Bitsch (19 July 1540, Ingwiller – 15 December 1569, Bouxwiller), was the only child and heiress of Count James of Zweibrücken-Bitsch (born: 19 July 1510; died: 22 March 1570) by his wife Catherine, born Countess of Honstein zu Klettenberg.  She was buried in Ingwiller.

Inheritance 
Her father, Count James of Zweibrücken-Bitsch (1510–1570), was the last male member of the House of Zweibrücken.  His older brother, Simon V Wecker, had already died in 1540.  Both James and Simon had only one daughter, Ludowika Margaretha and Amalie, respectively.  A dispute over the inheritance ensued between their husbands, Philip V of Hanau-Lichtenberg and Philip I of Leiningen-Westerburg, respectively.  The disputed territories include the Lordship of Bitsch, the district and castle of Lemberg, the Lordship of Ochsenstein and half of the Lordship of Lichtenberg (the other half was already held by the Counts of Hanau-Lichtenberg).  Bitsch was formally a fief of the Duchy of Lorraine and could in theory only be inherited in the male line.

Initially, Philip V appeared successful.  However, he immediately introduced the Lutheran faith in his newly gained territory and this made the powerful and Catholic Duke of Lorraine unhappy.  The Duke terminated the fief and in July 1572 Lorraine troops occupied the county. Since Philip V's army was no match for Lorraine, he took his case to the Reichskammergericht. During the trial, Lorraine argued that, firstly, a significant part of the territory of Zweibrücken-Bitsch had been obtained in an exchange with Lorraine in 1302 and, secondly, the Counts of Leiningen had sold their hereditary claims to Lorraine in 1573.

In 1604, Hanau-Lichtenberg and Lorraine decided to settle out of court. In a treaty signed in 1606, it was agreed that Bitsch would revert to Lorraine and Hanau-Lichtenberg would retain Lemberg. This was reasonable, as it corresponded approximately to the religious realities of the territories.

Marriage and issue 
She married on 14 October 1560 in Bitsch with Count Philip V of Hanau-Lichtenberg (1541–1599).  This was the first of his three marriages.  They had the following children:
 Johanna Sybille (born: 6 July 1564 in Lichtenberg; died on 24 March 1636 Runkel), married to Count William V of Wied-Runkel and Isenburg (died: 1612)
 Philip (born: 7 October 1565 in Bouxwiller; died: 31 August  1572 in Strasbourg; buried in Neuwiller-lès-Saverne)
 Albert (born: 22 November 1566  in Bouxwiller; died: 13 February 1577 in Haguenau; buried in Neuwiller)
 Catherine (born: 30 January 1568  in Bouxwiller; died 6 August 1636), married Schenk Eberhard of Limpurg-Speckfeld (1560–1622)
 Johann Reinhard I (born: 13 February 1569 in Bitsch, died: 19 November 1625 in Lichtenberg)

Notes

References
Hessisches Staatsarchiv Marburg, collection 81 Government Hanau

Further reading 
 Adrian Willem Eliza Dek: De Afstammelingen van Juliana van Stolberg tot aan het jaar van de vrede van Munster, Zaltbommel, 1968
 Reinhard Dietrich: Die Landesverfassung in dem Hanauischen = Hanauer Geschichtsblätter, vol. 34, Hanau, 1996, 
 M. Goltzené: Aus der Geschichte des Amtes Buchsweiler, in: "Pay d’Alsace", vol. 111/112, p. 64 f
 Franz Domenicus Häberlein: Neueste Teutsche Reichsgeschichte vom Anfange des Schmalkaldischen Krieges bis auf unsere Zeiten, vols. 8 and 9, Halle, 1779, 1780
 Heinrich Hermelink: Die Matrikeln der Universität Tübingen, vol. 1, Stuttgart, 1906
 J. G. Lehmann: Urkundliche Geschichte der Grafschaft Hanau-Lichtenberg im unteren Elsasse, 2 vols, 1862 (?), reprinted: Pirmasens, 1970.
 Wilhelm Morhardt: Hanau alt's - in Ehren b'halt's - Die Grafen von Hanau-Lichtenberg in Geschichte und Geschichten = "Babenhausen einst und jetzt", vol. 10, Babenhausen, 1984
 Reinhard Suchier: Genealogie des Hanauer Grafenhauses, in: Festschrift des Hanauer Geschichtsvereins zu seiner fünfzigjährigen Jubelfeier am 27. August 1894, Hanau, 1894
 Ernst J. Zimmermann: Hanau Stadt und Land, 3rd ed., Hanau, 1919, reprinted 1978

People from former German states in Rhineland-Palatinate
Countesses
People from Bas-Rhin
House of Hanau
1540 births
1569 deaths
16th-century German people